Richard Bonneau is an American computational biologist and data scientist whose primary research is in the following areas: learning networks from functional genomics data, predicting and designing protein and peptiodomimetic structure and applying data science to social networks. A professor at New York University, he holds appointments in the Department of Biology, the Center for Data Science and the Courant Institute of Mathematical Sciences.

Biography 
Bonneau is Vice-President, Machine Learning for Drug Discovery at Genentech and Group leader for the Systems Biology group in the center for computational biology at the Flatiron Institute. He was previously director of New York University Center for Data Science.

Scientific work 
In the area of structure prediction, Bonneau was one of the early authors on the Rosetta code,  one of the first codes to demonstrate the ability to predict protein structure in the absence of sequence homology.  Using IBM's World Community Grid to carry out folding of whole proteomes, his group has also applied structure prediction to the problem of genome and proteome annotation.

His group has made key contributions to the areas of genomics data analysis, focusing on two primary areas: 1. methods for network inference that uncover dynamics and topology from data and 2. methods that learn condition dependent co-regulated groups from integrations of different genomics data-types.

In 2013, he and his colleagues at NYU started a project to examine the impact of social media use on political attitudes and participation by applying methods from a range of academic disciplines. The project-- Social Media and Political Participation (SMaPP) --relies on both survey data and publicly available social media data  to address a range of questions concerning the causal processes that shape political participation.

Network inference and systems biology

Along with Vestienn Thorsson, David Reiss and Nitin Baliga he developed the Inferelator and cMonkey, two algorithms that were critical to an effort to learn a genome-wide model of the Halobacterium regulatory network.    Baliga and  Bonneau used their model to predict the genome-wide transcriptional dynamics of the cell’s response to new environments (publication in Cell in December 2007). This work represents the first fully data driven reconstruction of a cells regulatory network to include learning of kinetic/dynamical parameters as well as network topology.

References

Structure prediction
  Bonneau, R & Baker, D. (2001). Ab Initio Protein Structure Prediction: Progress and Prospects. Annu. Rev. Biophys. Biomol. Struct. 30, 173-89.
 Bonneau, R., Dylan Chivian, Charlie EM Strauss, Carol Rohl, David Baker. (2002) De Novo Prediction of Three Dimensional Structures for Major Protein Families. JMB, 322(1):65-78.
 Bonneau R, Baliga NS, Deutsch EW, Shannon P, Hood L. (2004) Comprehensive de novo structure prediction in a systems-biology context for the archaea Halobacterium sp. NRC-1. Genome Biology. 5(8):R52-68
 Mike Boxem, Zoltan Maliga, Niels J. Klitgord, Na Li, Irma Lemmens, Miyeko Mana, Lorenzo De Lichtervelde, Joram Mul, Diederik van de Peut, Maxime Devos, Nicolas Simonis, Anne-Lore Schlaitz, Murat Cokol, Muhammed A. Yildirim, Tong Hao, Changyu Fan, Chenwei Lin, Mike Tipsword, Kevin Drew, Matilde Galli, Kahn Rhrissorrakrai, David Drech-sel, David E. Hill, Richard Bonneau, Kristin C. Gunsalus, Frederick P. Roth, Fabio Piano, Jan Tavernier, Sander van den Heuvel, Anthony A. Hyman, Marc Vidal. A Protein Domain-Based Interactome Network for C. elegans Early Embryogenesis. (2008) Cell, 134(3) pp. 534 – 545.
 Andersen-Nissen E, Smith KD, Bonneau R, Strong RK, Aderem A. A conserved surface on Toll-like receptor 5 recognizes bacterial flagellin. (2007) J Exp Med. Feb 19;204(2):393-403.

Genomics and systems biology
 Bonneau, Richard. Learning biological networks: from modules to dynamics. Nature Chemical Biology 4, 658 - 664 (2008)
 Bonneau R, Reiss DJ, Shannon P, Hood L, Baliga NS, Thorsson V (2006) The Inferelator: a procedure for learning parsimonious regulatory networks from systems-biology data-sets de novo. Genome Biol. 7(5):R36. 
David J Reiss, Nitin S Baliga, Bonneau R. (2006) Integrated biclustering of heterogeneous genome-wide datasets. BMC Bioinformatics. 7(1):280.

External links
 Dr. Bonneau's Google Scholar page

American biochemists
Living people
Courant Institute of Mathematical Sciences faculty
Year of birth missing (living people)